Chachiyawas is a village in Ajmer tehsil of Ajmer district of Rajasthan state in India. The village falls under Chachiyawas gram panchayat.

References 

Villages in Ajmer district